Duop Thomas Reath (born 26 June 1996) is an Australian professional basketball player for the Qingdao Eagles of the Chinese Basketball Association (CBA). He played college basketball for the LSU Tigers. Reath was part of the Australian Basketball team that won bronze at the 2020 Tokyo Olympics.

Early life
Born in South Sudan, Reath and his family moved to Brisbane when he was aged 9. He moved again to Perth soon after where he attended Girrawheen Senior High School. Reath first played soccer with ambitions of playing for the Socceroos until a growth spurt in year ten led to him playing basketball.

College career 
Reath played the freshman and the sophomore season at Lee College in Baytown, Texas from 2014 to 2016. In the 2014–15 season, he averaged 6.9 points and 5.4 rebounds per game. As a sophomore (2015–16), he averaged 14.6 points and 8.4 rebounds per game.

Junior season 
In 2016, Reath joined LSU Tigers of the Southeastern Conference (SEC). He appeared in 31 games, including 30 starts in the Tigers' 2016–17 season. He averaged 12.0 points, 6.7 rebounds and 0.8 assists per game during the season. He was the SEC Player of the Week in the first week. On 19 December 2016 he scored season-high 23 points against the Charleston. On 4 February 2017 he pulled down career-high 16 rebounds against the Texas A&M.

Senior season 
Reath appeared in 33 games, including 28 starts in the Tigers' 2017–18 season. He averaged 12.6 points, 5.3 rebounds and 0.7 assists per game during the season. On 20 January 2018 he scored career-high 31 points against the Vanderbilt. He was named the SEC Player of the Week in the fifth week.

College statistics

|-
|style="text-align:left;"| 2016–17
| style="text-align:left;"| LSU
| 31 || 30 || 27.7 || .510 || .314 || .603 || 6.2 || .8 || .5 || 1.5 || 12.0
|-
|style="text-align:left;"| 2017–18
| style="text-align:left;"| LSU
| 33 || 28 || 24.2 || .544 || .422 || .629 || 5.3 || .7 || .5 || 1.0 || 12.5
|- class="sortbottom"
| style="text-align:center;" colspan="2" | Career
| 64 || 58 || 25.9 || .527 || .375 || .617 || 5.8 || .7 || .5 || 1.2 || 12.3

Professional career

Serbian League (2018–2021) 
After going undrafted in the 2018 NBA draft, Reath joined the Dallas Mavericks for the NBA Summer League.

On 1 August 2018, Reath signed a three-year contract with the Serbian team FMP. In July 2019, he joined the Brooklyn Nets for the 2019 NBA Summer League.

On 1 August 2020, Reath signed a contract with the Serbian team Crvena zvezda for the 2020–21 season.

Illawarra Hawks (2021–2022) 
On 19 June 2021, Reath signed with the Illawarra Hawks of the National Basketball League for the 2021–22 season.

Reath joined the Phoenix Suns in the 2022 NBA Summer League.

National team career 
Reath was selected as a member of the Australia national team for the 2020 Summer Olympics in Tokyo, Japan.

Personal life 
Reath was born in the southern part of Sudan, nowadays in South Sudan. At the age of 9 (2005), he moved to Perth, Australia alongside his parents and six brothers and sisters due to the civil war in Sudan.

See also 
 List of foreign basketball players in Serbia

References

External links
Player Profile at realgm.com
Statistics at sports-reference.com
Player Profile at aba-liga.com

1996 births
Living people
ABA League players
Australian expatriate basketball people in Serbia
Australian expatriate basketball people in the United States
Australian men's basketball players
Basketball players at the 2020 Summer Olympics
Basketball League of Serbia players
Centers (basketball)
Illawarra Hawks players
Junior college men's basketball players in the United States
KK Crvena zvezda players
KK FMP players
LSU Tigers basketball players
Medalists at the 2020 Summer Olympics
Naturalised citizens of Australia
Olympic basketball players of Australia
Olympic bronze medalists for Australia
Olympic medalists in basketball
People from Bieh
Power forwards (basketball)
South Sudanese emigrants to Australia
South Sudanese men's basketball players
Lee College (Texas) alumni